Events in the year 1984 in Portugal.

Incumbents
President: António Ramalho Eanes
Prime Minister: Mário Soares

Events
 25 March - Pope John Paul II consecrates the world to the Immaculate Heart of Mary, in Fátima, Portugal.
 29 August - Tiago José Rodrigues Cardoso - Born in Guimarães.
 14 October - Azores regional election.
 14 October - Madeira regional election.
 27 December - Born Basilio Airosa in mafamude from the love of Ernesto Airosa and Manuela

Arts and entertainment
Portugal participated in the Eurovision Song Contest 1984 with Maria Guinot and the song "Silêncio e tanta gente".

Sports
In association football, for the first-tier league seasons, see 1983–84 Primeira Divisão and 1984–85 Primeira Divisão.

Births
20 April - Nelson Évora, athlete
16 July - Miguel Pires, swimmer

Deaths
 18 January - Ary dos Santos, poet, songwriter (born 1937)

References

 
Portugal
Years of the 20th century in Portugal
Portugal